Demirören Group is a Turkish conglomerate company. Its properties include Milangaz (a liquefied petroleum gas distributor with 9% of the Turkish market), the Demirören İstiklal shopping mall in Taksim Square, as well as several newspapers, television and radio stations, and also a subscription based streaming service called D-Smart Go. Demirören also handles the licensing and distribution of Turkish Warner Bros. Discovery channels: Cartoon Network and CNN Türk. All shares of the Demirören Group are owned by the Demirören family, who have close ties to President Recep Tayyip Erdoğan and are also active in the energy, mining, and construction sectors.

History
Demirören acquired the newspapers Milliyet and Vatan in May 2011. In 2018, the holding bought the newspaper Hürriyet, Posta and the TV channels Kanal D, CNN Türk, 
and Çocuk Smart and all other media properties of Doğan Media Group, with the expection of Kanal D Romania and Slow Türk. 

Following the death of Erdoğan Demirören, President Erdoğan visited the family to extend his condolences. The family is generally seen as being supportive of President Erdoğan and the AK Party (Justice and Development Party).

In February 2021, the company took over Azerbaijan's lottery company ''Azerlotereya''.

References

External links

 Demiroren official website

Conglomerate companies of Turkey
Companies based in Istanbul
Mass media companies of Turkey
Holding companies of Turkey
Holding companies established in 1956
Turkish companies established in 1956